Alexander Anatolyevich Kovchan (Oleksandr Anatoliyovych Kovchan; born 21 October 1983) is a Ukrainian chess Grandmaster (2002).

Biography
Kovchan played for Ukraine in the 1995 Children's Chess Olympiad.

In 2011, he tied for 2nd–5th with Tigran Gharamian, Boris Grachev and Ante Brkić in the Open Master Tournament in Biel. In December 2011, he tied for 1st–2nd with Robert Hess in the Groningen Chess Festival and in the same tournament of the following year, he tied for 1st–3rd with Zaven Andriasian and Sipke Ernst, earning him an invitation to the 75th Tata Steel Chess Tournament in January 2013.

Kovchan competed in Grandmaster Group C of the 75th Tata Steel Chess Tournament from 11 to 27 January 2013 in Wijk aan Zee, where he finished 5th place by scoring 7½/13 (+3 =9 -1).

References

External links

Alexander Kovchan chess games at 365Chess.com

1983 births
Living people
Sportspeople from Chernihiv
Chess grandmasters
Ukrainian chess players